Kwamina is a musical with the libretto by Robert Alan Aurthur and music and lyrics by Richard Adler.

Production
The musical opened in out of town tryouts in Toronto, where, as noted by Ken Mandelbaum "The reviews were promising", and then ran in Boston. Kwamina premiered on Broadway at the 54th Street Theatre on October 23, 1961 and closed on November 18, 1961 after 32 performances. It starred Sally Ann Howes, Terry Carter, Robert Guillaume, and Brock Peters, and was directed by Robert Lewis and choreographed by Agnes de Mille. Mandelbaum noted that the Broadway reviews were "mixed but mostly negative", but did praise de Mille, her dancers, and the set.

Synopsis
The son of an African tribal chief returns home after attending medical school in London and finds his modern methods conflict with his village's traditions. He also butts heads with the village's white female doctor, but he ultimately falls in love with her.

Original cast album
The original cast album was recorded for Capitol Records on Monday, November 20, 1961 following the Saturday close two days earlier. A cast album had already been planned based on hopes that the show would be a hit, but Capitol Records, despite the extremely short run of the show, went ahead and made and released the album, and it has since reached a cult status.  It has recently been made available for online download on iTunes and Amazon (UK).

Jazz pianist Billy Taylor released The Original Jazz Score of Kwamina in 1961.

Songs

Act I
 The Cocoa Bean Song
Welcome Home
The Sun is Beginning to Crow
Did You Hear That?
You're As English As
Seven Sheep, Four Red Shirts, and a Bottle of Gin
Nothing More To Look Forward To
What's Wrong With Me?
Something Big
Ordinary People
A Man Can Have No Choice
What Happened to me Tonight?

Act II
One Wife - Mammy Trader, Alla, Singers and Dancers
Nothing More to Look Forward To (Reprise - Naii
Something Big (Reprise) - The Company
Another Time, Another Place - Eve
Fetish - Obitsebi and Dancers

References

Notes
 You Gotta Have Heart by Richard Adler.  1990
 Sing Out Louise! by Dennis McGovern & Deborah Grace Winer.  Schirmer Books, 1993.
 Not Since Carrie: Forty Years of Broadway Musical Flops by Ken Mandelbaum. St. Martin's Press, 1991
 Slings and Arrows: Theatre in My Life by Robert Lewis, Stein & Day, 1984.

External links

 

Broadway musicals
1961 musicals
Musicals by Richard Adler